The Bishop of Stepney is an episcopal title used by a suffragan bishop of the Church of England Diocese of London, in the Province of Canterbury, England. The title takes its name after Stepney, an inner-city district in the London Borough of Tower Hamlets. The post is held by Joanne Grenfell whose consecration as bishop, and start of her tenure as Bishop of Stepney, was on 3 July 2019 at St Paul's Cathedral; the principal consecrator was Justin Welby, Archbishop of Canterbury.

The first bishop was appointed to take responsibility for North and East London, which had been under the care of the Bishop of Bedford; the new See was erected because the retiring bishop Robert Billing retained the See of Bedford, and Stepney was a more obvious See for the suffragan for the East End. In 1898, the new Bishop of Islington received responsibility for North London. In the experimental area scheme of 1970, the bishop was given oversight of the deaneries of Tower Hamlets, Hackney, and Islington. The Bishops suffragan of Stepney have been area bishops since the London area scheme was founded in 1979.

List of bishops

References

External links
 Crockford's Clerical Directory - Listings
 * 

Bishops
Stepney